Raipur, also known as Baksot, is a village in Ghazipur district of Uttar Pradesh, India. It was a part of Daudpur and was also known as Nizampur.

References

Villages in Ghazipur district